Zimmerman is a surname variant of the German Zimmermann, meaning "carpenter".  The modern German terms for carpenter are Zimmerer, Tischler, or Schreiner, but Zimmermann is still used. It is also commonly associated with Ashkenazi Jews.

Zimmer in literal German means "room" or archaically a chamber within a structure; it is cognate with the English word "timber". The German mann means "man" or "worker". Combining the two German words, one gets "a worker of wood", or, literally translated, "room man" or "room worker".

Within the United States, it is ranked as the 441st-most common surname.

German names were regularly Anglicized with immigration. Surnames were often translated, so in this case, Zimmerman would become Carpenter. Later generations also altered their original family names frequently after being in the United States many years.

 Simmerman: a variant of Zimmerman.
 Timmerman: Dutch variant of Zimmerman.

Zimmerman may refer to:

People
Andrew Zimmerman (born 1968), American historian and academic
Anna-Maria Zimmermann (born 1988), German singer
Arnold Zimmerman (born 1954), American ceramic artist
Arthur Augustus Zimmerman (1869–1936), American champion cyclist
Arthur Zimmermann (1864–1940), State Secretary for Foreign Affairs of the German Empire
Eberhard August Wilhelm von Zimmermann, German geographer, zoologist and professor
Benjamin Zimmerman (1862–1923), member of the Jewish emigration from Russia
Bernd Alois Zimmermann (1918–1970), German composer
Carl Zimmerman (cricketer) (1898–1969), New Zealand cricketer
Carle C. Zimmerman (1897-1983), American sociologist
Charles A. Zimmermann (1861–1916), American bandmaster and composer
Charles H. Zimmerman (1908–1996), aeronautical engineer
Charles S. Zimmerman (1896–1983), American socialist activist and trade union official
Dean Zimmerman (philosopher), American philosopher, academic, and author
Dick Zimmerman (born 1937), American magician and pianist
Don Z. Zimmerman (1903-1983), American military officer
Elizabeth Zimmerman (born 1948), Filipina retired flight attendant and former wife of President Rodrigo Duterte
Elyn Zimmerman (born 1945), American sculptor
Eric Zimmerman (born 1969), American computer game designer
Eugene Zimmerman (1862–1935), American cartoonist
Eugene Zimmerman (industrialist) (1845–1914), American industrialist 
Franklin B. Zimmerman (born 1923), American musicologist
Frederick Henry Zimmerman (1883-1968), American businessman and farmer
Frederick Hinde Zimmerman (born 1864), American farmer and businessman
Fred R. Zimmerman (1880–1954), American politician
Gabe Zimmerman (1980-2011), Director of Community Outreach for Gabrielle Giffords 
George J. Zimmermann (1882–1938), American mayor of Buffalo, New York
George Zimmerman (born 1983), shot and killed Trayvon Martin
George O. Zimmerman (born 1935), Polish-American scientist and professor
Heinie Zimmerman (1887–1969), American baseball player
Herman F. Zimmerman (born 1935), art director and production designer
Howard Zimmerman (1926–2012), American professor of chemistry
Jacob Zimmerman (1831–1912), newspaper editor and owner, politician, and businessman
James Edward Zimmerman (1923–1999), American physicist
James Fulton Zimmerman (1847–1944) Historian, sociologist, president of New Mexico University
Jason Zimmerman (born 1989), professional game player under the pseudonym Mew2King
Jeff Zimmerman (American football) (born 1965), American football player
Jeff Zimmerman (born 1972), Canadian-born baseball pitcher
Jens Zimmermann (born 1981), German politician
Jeri Zimmerman, birth name of Jeri Ryan (born 1968), American actor
J. Fred Zimmerman Jr. (1871–1948), American theater manager and stage producer
J. Fred Zimmerman Sr. (1841–1925), American theater owner
Jill Zimmerman, computer scientist and James M. Beall Professor of Mathematics and Computer Science at Goucher College
Joel Zimmerman (born 1981), progressive house artist known as deadmau5
Jo Ann Zimmerman (1936–2019), American nurse and politician
John Zimmerman (politician), American politician
John Zimmerman (figure skater) (born 1973), American figure skater
 Jonathan Zimmerman , American historian of education and Professor of History of Education
Jordan Zimmerman (born 1975), professional baseball pitcher
Joey Zimmerman (born 1986), American actor
Joshua Soule Zimmerman (1874–1962), American lawyer, politician, and orchardist
Kris Zimmerman, American voice actor and voice-over director
Leigh Zimmerman, American actress, singer and dancer
Leo Wrye Zimmerman (1924–2008), abstract artist 
Mary Zimmerman, American dramatist
Matt Zimmerman (disambiguation), multiple people 
Michael E. Zimmerman (born 1946), American philosopher, academic, and author
Michael Zimmerman (historian) (1951–2007), German chronicler
Michael Zimmerman (biologist) (born 1953), American biologist and professor
Michael Zimmerman (tennis) (born 1970), American tennis player
Nancy Zimmerman, American hedge fund manager
Oscar Zimmerman (1910–1987), American classical musician
Patric Zimmerman (born 1954), American voice actor
Paul Zimmerman (sportswriter) (1932–2018), American football sportswriter known as "Dr. Z"
Paul D. Zimmerman (1938–1993), American screenwriter, film critic and activist
Peter Zimmerman (born 1941), American nuclear physicist and academic
Philip Zimmerman (born 1945), American iconographer
Phyllis Zimmerman (1934-2012) American composer, conductor and educator
Pia Zimmermann (born 1956), German politician
Preston Zimmerman (born 1988), American footballer for Hamburg SV II
Rachel Zimmerman (born ca 1973), Canadian-born space scientist and inventor
Robert Allen Zimmerman, birth name of Bob Dylan (born 1941), American singer-songwriter
Robert C. Zimmerman (1910–1996), American politician
Robert D. Zimmerman (born 1952), American author of mysteries, psychological thrillers, and children's books
Roy Zimmerman (baseball) (1916–1991), baseball player
Roy Zimmerman (satirist) (born 1957), American singer/songwriter/guitarist
Ryan Zimmerman (born 1984), American baseball player
Sabine Zimmermann (born 1960), German politician
Samuel Zimmerman (1815–1857), Canadian railway entrepreneur
Shannon Zimmerman, American businessman and politician
Sheldon Zimmerman (born 1942), American Reform rabbi
Shraga Feivel Zimmerman, American rabbi 
Steven Zimmerman, American organic chemist and professor
Thomas Zimmerman (1838–1914), German-American writer and translator
Trent Zimmerman (born 1968), Australian politician
Udo Zimmermann (1943–2021), German composer, musicologist, opera director and conductor
Urs Zimmermann (born 1959), Swiss road racing cyclist
Vernon K. Zimmerman (born 1928), American accounting scholar
William Carbys Zimmerman (1856–1932), American architect

Fictional characters
Pvt. Fielding Zimmerman, character in The Phil Silvers Show.
Lewis Zimmerman, creator of the Emergency Medical Hologram in the Star Trek series
Dr. Zimmerman, former employee of "the Company" in the Heroes series
Jára Cimrman, a Czech character of a universal genius
Moritz Zimmerman, character in "How to sell drugs online (fast)" Netflix series
Florence Zimmerman, a character in "The House with a Clock in Its Walls"

Places in the United States
Zimmerman, Minnesota, a city in Sherburne County
Zimmerman, Pennsylvania, an unincorporated community in Somerset County 
Zimmerman Kame, an archeological site in Ohio's Hardin County

See also
Zimmerman (disambiguation)
Zimmermann (disambiguation)

References

Occupational surnames
German-language surnames
Jewish surnames